Caribbean360 is the largest online news aggregator for the Caribbean. Started in 2005, it is based in Bridgetown, Barbados. Specializing in news sources from the nations of the Caribbean Community, it competes with One Caribbean Media and the Caribbean Net News. As of 2009, it drew from 35 print and electronic publishers in 28 countries.

Iain Dale calls it "the most comprehensive pan-Caribbean blog", while the Keele Guide lists it as one of only five "Media and News" sources for the "Caribbean and Central America Generally"

Syndicated sources
 Antigua: Antigua Sun
 Aruba: Bon Dia
 Bahamas: The Nassau Guardian
 Barbados: The Barbados Advocate, Broad Street Journal, The Nation
 Bermuda: Bermuda Sun
 Bequia: Bequia Herald
 British: Virgin Islands Island Sun, Daily News
Cayman: Cayman Net News, Cay Compass
Cuba: Granma (Spanish)
Curaçao:  Amigoe (Dutch)
Dominica: Independent, New Chronicle, News Dominica, The Times
Dominican Republic: Hoy (Spanish)
Guadeloupe: Le Journale de Barthe (French)
Guyana: Guyana Chronicle, Stabroek News, Le Journal de Saint Barth (French)
Grenada: Grenada Today
Haiti: Agence Haitienne de Presse (French), Agence Haitienne de Presse (English), AlterPresse (Frency), Haiti Press Network, Haiti Progres (French)
Jamaica: Jamaica Gleaner, Jamaica Observer, Stabroek News
Margarita: La Hora-Isla,  Jamaica Observer
Montserrat: Montserrat Reporter
Puerto Rico: El Nuevo Dia, Puerto Rico WOW
Santo Domingo: Listin Diario (Spanish)
St. Kitts & Nevis: The Democrat
St. Lucia: The Star The Mirror
St. Vincent & the Grenadines: Searchlight, SVG Express, The Vincentian
Suriname: Dagblad Suriname (Dutch), De Ware Tijd (Dutch), De West (Dutch), Times of Suriname
Trinidad: Trinidad Express, Trinidad Guardian,  Newsday,  Virgin Islands Daily News
US Virgin Islands: Daily News
Venezuela: Caracas News

External links

Official Website
World ABC News
ShartNews Homepage
Decentralized Finance News

News aggregators
Mass media in Barbados